William Shepherd (September 17, 1837 – 1907) was a Massachusetts politician who served in the Massachusetts House of Representatives and as the 29th Mayor of Lynn, Massachusetts.

Early life and education
Shepherd was born in Red Hill, County Cavan, Ireland on September 17, 1837.  Shepherd moved to the United States when he was 9 years old.  He was educated in the Boston Public Schools, graduating from the Mayhew grammar school.

Business career
Shepherd moved to Lynn in 1857 where he learned the trade of shoe making.  Shepherd went into the business of shoe manufacturing with his brother Alan G. Shepherd.   Shepherd later worked for other manufactures as a foreman.

Community involvement
Shepherd was a member of the Fire Department and a member of he represented Ward 3  on the Lynn Common Council.

Massachusetts House of Representatives
Shepherd was elected to serve in the Massachusetts House of Representatives of 1895 and 1896, representing the 20th Essex district, which was made up out of Wards 6 and 7 of Lynn and the Town of Saugus.   In the House  Shepherd served on the Committee on Public and Charitable Institutions.

Mayor of Lynn
Shepherd served as the Mayor of Lynn, Massachusetts from 1899 to 1902.

Notes

1837 births
Massachusetts city council members
Mayors of Lynn, Massachusetts
Republican Party members of the Massachusetts House of Representatives
1907 deaths
19th-century American politicians